Flavio Prendi (born 12 October 1995 in Pukë) is an Albanian professional footballer who currently plays for Dinamo Tirana in the Albanian First Division.

References

External links
 Profile - FSHF

1995 births
Living people
People from Pukë
Albanian footballers
Association football defenders
KS Kastrioti players
KF Tërbuni Pukë players
KS Turbina Cërrik players
FK Dinamo Tirana players
Kategoria e Parë players
Kategoria Superiore players